Vidovište is a village in the municipality of Zrnovci, North Macedonia.

Demographics
According to the 2002 census, the village had a total of 494 inhabitants. Ethnic groups in the village include:

Macedonians 481
Aromanians 13

References

Villages in Zrnovci Municipality